Jodi Applegate (born May 2, 1964) is an American broadcast journalist. She served as an anchorwoman for local stations and  nationally for both MSNBC and NBC News.

Life and career
Applegate was raised in an Irish American Catholic family in Moon Township, Pennsylvania, which is a suburb of Pittsburgh. In 1982, Applegate graduated from Moon Area High School. After studying at Temple University in Philadelphia for her freshman year, she transferred as a sophomore to New York University and graduated with a degree in television and film.

Before she was in journalism, Applegate briefly worked as an actress. In 1986, she appeared in a television version of the classic children's book A Pocket for Corduroy as the mother. In 1987, Applegate appeared in a television version of the Mercer Mayer children's book There's a Nightmare in My Closet, also as the main character's mother.

In the early 1990s, Applegate was a host of Close Up on C-SPAN, a weekly public affairs program that featured a high school student audience. She later worked as a radio and television traffic reporter for Metro Traffic in San Francisco. From 1993 to 1996, Applegate hosted Good Morning Arizona on KTVK in Phoenix. Applegate was also an anchor at KTVN in Reno, Nevada. Applegate met Rob Nikoleski in Reno; he was the sports news director at a competing Reno station, KOLO. They married and eight years later were divorced. 

In 1996, Applegate was the first face seen on the cable network MSNBC at the station's launch. She anchored MSNBC Live and Weekend Today on the main NBC network. She also filled in as a substitute host on the Today show. In late 1999, she hosted Later Today with Florence Henderson and Asha Blake. The show was canceled in 2000.

In mid-2001, Applegate joined WFXT in Boston. She anchored the short-lived Fox 25 News at 4:30 newscast and moved to the 5 pm slot by early 2002. She anchored the Fox 25 Morning News for about a year beginning in September 2003; she moved to New York sister station WNYW in October 2004.

As of May 2020, Applegate has hosted infomercials for Westmore Beauty Body Coverage.

Career in New York City
Applegate joined WNYW as co-anchor of the station's morning program, Good Day New York, in 2005. She was there for three years and was replaced in the role by Rosanna Scotto in 2008. Applegate left the station shortly thereafter. On May 28, 2008, she appeared once in the Broadway musical Chicago.

In 2009, Applegate began work as a fill-in anchor on all-news WCBS radio. She guest-hosted Living Today on Sirius XM Radio's Martha Stewart Living Radio channel, filling in for another former Good Day New York anchor, Mario Bosquez. Applegate also guest-hosted radio talk shows hosted by Joan Hamburg on WOR in New York, and Howie Carr on WRKO in Boston.

Applegate made a return to television news in September 2009 joining News 12 Long Island as an evening co-anchor.  With three months remaining in her one-year contract, she was allowed to leave News 12 in order to join WPIX. The Tribune Company-owned station named her as sole anchor of its revamped 10:00 PM newscasts on weeknights; she started in that capacity on October 11, 2010. Applegate also anchored the station's hour-long 5:00 PM newscast, which was launched in the fall of 2011.

Personal life
Applegate married New York Yankees television broadcaster Michael Kay on February 12, 2011, in New York City. The ceremony took place at the Plaza Hotel and was officiated by former New York mayor, Rudolph Giuliani.

On November 21, 2012, it was announced that Applegate was expecting a baby, which was conceived by way of a gestational surrogate. She announced her departure and left WPIX later on December 19, 2012. In January 2013, her daughter Caledonia, was born. In November 2014, her son Charles, was born.

She and her family reside in Greenwich, Connecticut.

References

External links
 

1964 births
American people of Irish descent
Television anchors from Boston
Television anchors from New York City
Tisch School of the Arts alumni
Temple University alumni
People from Moon Township, Allegheny County, Pennsylvania
Journalists from Pennsylvania
Living people
American women television journalists